The Caterpillar D6 track-type tractor is a medium bulldozer manufactured by Caterpillar Inc. with a nominal operating weight of . The military versions were classified as the SNL G152 medium tractor, under the G-numbers classification system used for army tractors.

D6 Version history

The D6 started out in 1935 as the RD6, fitted with a 3-cylinder  D6600 engine. The numbering was changed to the D6 in 1937.
Caterpillar first introduced the entirely new D6 in 1941 with the 4R & 5R series.

 In 1959 the D6 was replaced with the D6B after 60,000 D6 4R/5R and 8U/9U tractors had been built.
 In 1963 the D6C was introduced.
 The D6H was introduced in 1986 along with 3 other H-Series track-type tractors.  This was the first D6 with Caterpillar's elevated drive sprocket undercarriage.
 The D6R replaced the D6H in 1996, and came in five models ranging from the  D6R to the  D6R XL and XR, and the  D6R XL (IG) and D6R LGP.  All used the Cat 3306T 6 cylinder engine.
Both used the Cat 3116T engine.

Dozer blades
The dozer blade on front of the tractor can come in different varieties: 
A straight blade ("S-Blade") which is short and has no lateral curve, no side wings, and can be used for fine grading.
A universal blade ("U-Blade") which is tall and very curved, and has large side wings to carry more material.
An "S-U" combination blade which is shorter, has less curvature, and smaller side wings.
A Power Angle Tilt ("PAT") blade is a straight blade which has the ability to change the angle of the blade from side to side as well as the ability to hydraulically raise, tilt and angle the blade.  This configuration is typically used in fine grading applications.

Rear equipment

The rear of the machine can be outfitted with various work tools to complement the front blade:
 The rear of the machine can have large slabs of steel to add weight to the rear of the machine to aid in heavy dozing applications.
 A drawbar and CCU (Cable control unit) for pulling towed scrapers and trailed implements; later models now use hydraulics in place of the CCU to operate scrapers.
 A hydraulic winch can be outfitted on the rear of the machine for towing or pulling; for forestry work, usually with a lighter front blade as well for pushing the brush and trees about.
 A ripper with a single or multiple shanks can be added to the rear of the machine to break up hard soil or rock.
 Fitted with a linkage (three-point hitch) for use in agriculture with mounted implements like plows.

The crawler tractor is powerful, yet small and light weighing 16 to 20 tons (18 to 23 short tons) depending on configuration. This makes it ideal for working on very steep slopes, in forests, and for backfilling pipelines safely without risking damage to the pipe.

A low ground pressure version is also available with extra wide tracks to provide low ground pressure which allows working in muddy areas without sinking.

See also
 Civil engineering
 Heavy equipment
 Caterpillar D7
 Caterpillar D5
 List of Caterpillar Inc. machines

References
Caterpillar Pocket Guide (Track type tractors 1925-57), Iconographix,

External links
Caterpillar D-Series Track-Type Tractors - Official Caterpillar website
Configure your own Caterpillar Track-Type Tractor - from the official website
Military  D6 at U.S. Veterans Memorial Museum

Caterpillar Inc. vehicles
Tractors
Tracked vehicles
Bulldozers